Subhas Chandra Mungra (born 2 September 1945) is a Surinamese diplomat and former Foreign Minister. He served as Ambassador to the US from 2011 until 2017, and served as Permanent Representative of Suriname on the Permanent Council of the Organization of American States.

References 

Foreign ministers of Suriname
Finance ministers of Suriname
1945 births
Living people
Ambassadors of Suriname to the United States